Pieter Smith (born 8 December 1963) is a South African weightlifter. He competed in the men's light heavyweight event at the 1992 Summer Olympics.

References

External links
 

1963 births
Living people
South African male weightlifters
Olympic weightlifters of South Africa
Weightlifters at the 1992 Summer Olympics
Place of birth missing (living people)